Jabisa Forest Park is a forest park in the Gambia. It covers 16 hectares.

It is located in Lower River, the estimate terrain elevation above sea level is 11 metres.

References

Forest parks of the Gambia